Troublesome Night 10 is a 2001 Hong Kong horror-comedy film produced by Nam Yin and directed by Edmond Yuen. It is the tenth of the 20 films in the Troublesome Night film series.

Plot
A boss and his employees go on an excursion to Cheung Chau. The stingy boss rents a building for its low rental rate, even though he is aware that people had died from unnatural causes there. He meets a young woman and tries to woo her. Meanwhile, the employees encounter abnormal events while enjoying themselves and they begin to suspect that the woman might be linked to those strange events.

Cast
 Wayne Lai as the Boss
 Law Lan as Mrs Bud Lung
 Sherming Yiu as Yee
 Tong Ka-fai as Bud Gay
 Grace Lam as See
 Wong Hok-lam as Lim
 Onitsuka as Lai Chor-pat
 Mr Nine as Lai Chor-kau
 Alson Wong as Pong
 Benny Law as Keung
 Pinky Cheung as Ghost
 Jeff Kam as Jeffrey

External links
 
 

2001 comedy horror films
2001 films
Hong Kong comedy horror films
2000s Cantonese-language films
Troublesome Night (film series)
2000s Hong Kong films